Coreley is a small, dispersed village and civil parish in south Shropshire, England, near to Clee Hill Village.
The name Corely comes from the Old English corn meaning a crane/heron and lēah meaning a forest/wood. This translates to crane wood/farmland.

History
Coreley is a very rural parish and historically industry in Coreley has been dominated by agriculture. In 1831 the occupation of men living in Coreley was largely dominated by farmers and agricultural labourers. In 1881 industry in Coreley was also engaged in mining which attracted the majority of working males whilst others continued with agricultural practices.
This contrasts with the more recent 2001 census which states that only 8% of both men and women were working in the agricultural field and mining was no longer represented due to the mining industry being closed down in 1984. The most popular career paths for the population of Coreley, according to 2001 census are: Construction; Health and Social Work and Real Estate.

Listed buildings include Brook Row Cottage, Colliers Arms Public House and Hints Farm, all Grade II.

Transport

Bus Service
The village is near the A4117, along which travels the 292 Kidderminster to Ludlow bus.

Rail Links
The closest station to Coreley is in Ludlow which offers a regular train service to Manchester, Cardiff or to Birmingham via Hereford

Local Businesses
 Cleobury Mortimer Golf Club - The nearby town of Kidderminster offers a premier 27 hole golf facility founded in 1993.
 OTS Electricians - The also nearby town of Ludlow has a locally well-endorsed electricians named OTS which operate across Shropshire

See also
Listed buildings in Coreley

References

External links

Civil parishes in Shropshire
Villages in Shropshire